Phước Trung is a ward of Bà Rịa in Bà Rịa–Vũng Tàu province, Vietnam.

References

Communes of Bà Rịa-Vũng Tàu province
Populated places in Bà Rịa-Vũng Tàu province